Seascale is a civil parish in the Borough of Copeland, Cumbria, England.  It contains three listed buildings that are recorded in the National Heritage List for England.  All the listed buildings are designated at Grade II, the lowest of the three grades, which is applied to "buildings of national importance and special interest".  The parish contains the village of Seascale and the surrounding countryside.  The listed buildings comprise a farmhouse, a former water tower, and a church.


Buildings

References

Citations

Sources

Lists of listed buildings in Cumbria
Listed buildings